The 2021 College Football Playoff National Championship was a college football bowl game played on January 11, 2021, with kickoff at 8:15 p.m. EST at Hard Rock Stadium in Miami Gardens, Florida and was televised by ESPN. The seventh College Football Playoff National Championship, the game determined a national champion in the National Collegiate Athletic Association's Division I Football Bowl Subdivision (FBS) for the 2020 season. Aside from the all-star games scheduled to follow, it was the culminating game of the 2020–21 bowl season. Sponsored by telecommunications company AT&T, the game was officially known as the 2021 College Football Playoff National Championship presented by AT&T.

The championship featured the winner of the Rose Bowl, the top-seeded Alabama Crimson Tide from the Southeastern Conference (SEC) dominating the winners of the Sugar Bowl, the third-seeded Ohio State Buckeyes from the Big Ten Conference, 52–24. The win gave Alabama head coach Nick Saban his seventh national championship, breaking Bear Bryant's record for the most by a Division I college football coach.

Background
This was the second of four consecutive College Football Playoff National Championship games matching the  3 seed and the No. 1 seed, with No. 1 LSU defeating the No. 3 Clemson Tigers 42-25 in the 2020 edition.

Host selection
In August 2018, Hard Rock Stadium in Miami Gardens, Florida, was announced as the host site for the seventh College Football Playoff (CFP) National Championship. The Rose Bowl and Sugar Bowl were designated as semifinal games; both semifinals were scheduled for January 1, 2021.

On August 5, 2020, CFP organizers announced that they would move the release of final rankings and semifinal matchups (sometimes referred to as "Selection Weekend") from December 6 to 20, in order to accommodate conferences that had delayed their championship games to mid-December. On December 20, the semifinal pairings were announced, with No. 1 Alabama matched with No. 4 Notre Dame in the Rose Bowl, and No. 2 Clemson matched with No. 3 Ohio State in the Sugar Bowl.

Impact of the COVID-19 pandemic

The Rose Bowl game, normally played in Pasadena, California, was moved to Arlington, Texas, prompted by the COVID-19 pandemic in California. As the 2020 FBS season was impacted by the COVID-19 pandemic in the United States, CFP organizers had identified a contingency date of January 18 for the championship game, which did not need to be used. Attendance at Hard Rock Stadium was limited to approximately 20% of normal capacity, with the official attendance listed as 14,926.

2021 College Football Playoff

The playoff games were played on January 1st. In the Rose Bowl for the first semifinal, Alabama defeated Notre Dame 35-14. In the Sugar Bowl for the second semifinal, Ohio State defeated Clemson 49-28, to get their first win over them, after four previous attempts.

Bracket

Teams
The game featured No. 1 Alabama, winner of the Rose Bowl, and No. 3 Ohio State, winner of the Sugar Bowl. The teams had previously met four times, with Alabama holding a 3–1 edge. Their most recent meeting had been in the 2015 Sugar Bowl, a CFP semifinal, which was won by Ohio State, 42–35.

Alabama Crimson Tide

Alabama entered the National Championship game with a 12–0 record, having won all 10 of their Southeastern Conference (SEC) regular season games, followed by a win over Florida in the SEC Championship Game, and a win over Notre Dame in the Rose Bowl CFP semifinal. Alabama had a record of 2–2 in prior CFP National Championship games, having won in 2016 and 2018 and having lost in 2017 and 2019.

Ohio State Buckeyes 

Ohio State entered the game with a record of 7–0, having won all five of their Big Ten Conference regular season games, followed by a win over Northwestern in the Big Ten Championship Game, and a win over Clemson in the Sugar Bowl CFP semifinal. Ohio State had appeared in one prior CFP National Championship game, having won the inaugural edition in 2015, after defeating Alabama in the semifinal. On January 11, the Buckeyes advised that 13 players would not be available for the game, including two starting defensive linemen (Tommy Togiai and Tyreke Smith) and two kickers (Blake Haubeil and Dominic DiMaccio); specific reasons were not provided, but at least one player's post on social media indicated that it was due to a positive COVID-19 test.

Starting lineups

Source:

Game summary

First half
Alabama won the coin toss and deferred possession to the second half. Ohio State's opening position began on the 25 following a touchback, but quickly fizzled into a three-and-out. Alabama started their opening drive at their own 22-yard-line following the punt and picked up four first downs en route to a 4th-and-goal rushing touchdown by Najee Harris to open the scoring. During the drive, cameras showed Ohio State running back Trey Sermon walking to the locker room with an apparent shoulder injury sustained on the first play of the game. Alabama kicker Will Reichard resumed the game with another touchback, giving the Buckeyes the football on the 25-yard-line again. Ohio State's second drive looked very different from their first: Master Teague scored a touchdown on an eight yard rush to cap an eight-play drive and tie the game. Filling in for kicker Blake Haubeil, who did not travel with the Ohio State team due to COVID issues, punter Drue Chrisman handled the kickoff, which was taken back to the 25. Alabama drove all the way to the Ohio State five-yard-line, including another 4th down conversion, before the quarter expired with the score tied at seven.

On the second quarter's opening play, Tide quarterback Mac Jones connected with Heisman winner DeVonta Smith for a five-yard passing touchdown, giving Alabama a lead it would not relinquish for the rest of the game. Following the conclusion of the drive, it was announced that Trey Sermon was on the way to the hospital and would not return for the game. Ohio State's ensuing drive began on the 25 after a touchback. The Buckeyes drove the ball to the Alabama 44 before stalling; the ensuing punt was downed by the Tide at their own 12-yard-line. Alabama started their next drive well, with a 12-yard pass from Jones to Smith, before Ohio State linebacker Baron Browning sacked Jones and forced a fumble, which he recovered. Ohio State took one play to find the end zone – following a pass interference in the end zone, the Buckeyes got the ball on the 4-yard-line and tied the game with a Master Teague rushing touchdown, his second of the contest. The Tide responded quickly; it took them only five plays to score on a Najee Harris 26-yard reception, giving them back a touchdown lead. On the ensuing Ohio State drive, Alabama safety Jordan Battle was disqualified for targeting; the Buckeyes finished the drive with a field goal, cutting the Alabama lead to four. Alabama's next drive began on their own 25, and the Tide's offense had no problem moving the ball down the field again, with Jones finding Smith for the second time to take a two-possession lead. The Buckeyes' offense gained only four yards on their ensuing drive, and they punted for the second time. Smith returned the punt for 19 yards, setting Alabama up at their own 40-yard-line. Alabama scored even more quickly on this drive – Smith found the end zone on a 42-yard pass on just the third play of the drive to extend the lead to 18 points. Ohio State ended their final drive of the first half with another three-and-out, and their defense held with seconds left on the clock in the half and forced an Alabama punt, their first of the game. Ohio State knelt the ball and ended the first half, with Alabama leading 35–17 at halftime.

Second half
Alabama started their first drive of the second half with the ball on their own 23-yard-line, and ended the drive with a Will Reichard field goal sixteen plays later, making this drive the game's longest. Ohio State responded with their shortest touchdown drive of the contest, as a 33-yard rush by Justin Fields set up a 20-yard pass from Fields to wide receiver Garrett Wilson, cutting Alabama's lead back to two touchdowns. During Alabama's ensuing drive, DeVonta Smith suffered a hand injury that caused him to retreat to the locker room. The Crimson Tide scored again, as Slade Bolden caught a five-yard Mac Jones pass and increased the lead back to 21. Ohio State's first turnover of the game, a turnover on downs, ended their next drive at their own 43-yard-line, and the third quarter ended shortly thereafter.

Alabama increased their lead to four touchdowns on the fourth play of the game's final quarter, as Najee Harris scored for the second time. Ohio State's next drive saw them take the ball all the way to the Alabama 6-yard-line, but an incomplete pass on 4th & goal ended the Buckeyes' drive with a turnover on downs. Neither offense could capitalize on their next possession, as the teams then traded three-and-outs. Alabama was able to run the remaining clock out and the game and football season concluded with the Crimson Tide as national champions, 52–24. Despite being injured in the third quarter, DeVonta Smith was named the offensive most valuable player (MVP), and Christian Barmore of Alabama's defensive line was named defensive MVP.

Scoring summary

Statistics

Broadcasting
The game was televised nationally in the United States by ESPN for the seventh straight year, along with its sister networks and ESPN+ in a "Megacast" made up of several other channels, including game data, radio calls from the Ohio State and Alabama radio networks, stadium audio-only, and other camera angles. The game announcers were Chris Fowler and Kirk Herbstreit, with Maria Taylor and Allison Williams serving as sideline reporters.

See also
 College football national championships in NCAA Division I FBS
 2021 Orange Bowl (January), played at the same venue nine days earlier

Notes

References

External links
 
 Game statistics at statbroadcast.com

National Championship
2020–21 NCAA football bowl games
Alabama Crimson Tide football bowl games
Ohio State Buckeyes football bowl games
College Football Playoff National Championship
College Football Playoff National Championship
College Football Playoff National Championship
American football in Florida